Kerry Darrell Rossall (born June 23, 1947) is an American stuntman, actor and producer.  He is best known for portraying "Mike from San Diego" in the 1979 war film Apocalypse Now. Rossall's career as a stuntman and coordinator stems films such as Apocalypse Now, The Abyss, Air Force One, Die Hard with a Vengeance, Six Days Seven Nights, Blade, Rush Hour, The Green Mile, and Ocean's Eleven.

Life and career
Rossall was born in Los Angeles and lives in Carlsbad. Despite being credited among stars like Arnold Schwarzenegger and Sylvester Stallone, he has remained out of the news for most of his career.

Apocalypse Now
Following the rerelease titled Apocalypse Now Redux (2001) alongside stunt performers Terry Leonard, Steve Boyum and Joe Finnegan, Rossall shared Taurus World Stunt Awards nominations for 3 stunts in the film: Best Fire Stunt, Best Water Work, and Best Work With a Vehicle. He also played the part of "Mike from San Diego" and advises Bill Kilgore about Charlie's point, in which the Lieutenant Colonel (played by Robert Duvall) responds, "Charlie don't surf!"

Later work
He met actor Don Handfield at a gas station after noticing Handfield's car had a camera mounted to it.  He was later brought into Handfield's directorial project "Driver's Ed" as Second Unit Director. It was then pitched to Broken Lizard as a web series, but was eventually released as a TV deal.

On February 3, 2011, Rossall was the stunt coordinator while filming an episode of the TV show Justified.  At approximately 1:30 a.m., stunt performer Lisa Hoyle was knocked unconscious when a parked car rolled over her ankle after being hit by another car.  She and another stunt performer said they were never informed that the car they were near would be involved in the stunt.  She claimed she was getting food during the meeting in which the stunt was being explained.  On February 1, 2013, Hoyle filed a lawsuit against Sony Pictures in which she says the incident wrecked her body and ruined her marriage.  Rossall and Hoyle's husband (now divorced) were among the defendants in the case. Rossall had also organized a phone meeting about the stunt, but both performers allegedly were not informed of that call.

In 2017, Rossall was the executive producer for acclaimed dark comedy Friend of the World by Brian Patrick Butler. The film was made in San Diego, premiered at the Oceanside International Film Festival in 2020 and was nominated for two San Diego Film Awards.

Filmography

Film

Television

Accolades

References

External links

1947 births
Living people
American male film actors
American male television actors
American stunt performers
20th-century American male actors
21st-century American male actors
Male actors from Los Angeles
People from Carlsbad, California
Film producers from California
Male actors from San Diego
Stunt doubles
Stunt drivers